Michel Kreder (born 15 August 1987) is a Dutch former professional road racing cyclist, who rode professionally between 2008 and 2019.

Career
However, in September 2014 it was announced that Michel, Raymond and Wesley Kreder would all sign for the new  for 2015. In October 2016  announced that Kreder would be part of their inaugural squad for the 2017 season.

Personal life
Kreder was born, raised, and resides in The Hague, South Holland, Netherlands. He comes from a family of professional cyclists; his cousin Wesley Kreder and his younger brother Raymond Kreder also competed professionally.

Major results

2004
 3rd Road race, National Junior Road Championships
2007
 1st Stage 4 Thüringen Rundfahrt der U23
 5th Overall Tour des Pyrénées
2008
 1st Stage 1 Tour Alsace
 5th Overall Grand Prix Guillaume Tell
 6th De Vlaamse Pijl
 8th Overall Olympia's Tour
 9th Overall Circuito Montañés
1st Stage 3
2009
 2nd Overall Istrian Spring Trophy
 4th Grand Prix de la Ville de Lillers
 4th Rund um Düren
 5th Overall Tour de l'Avenir
 8th Overall Circuito Montañés
1st Stage 1
 8th Overall Tour de Bretagne
 8th Overall Tour du Poitou-Charentes
 10th Overall Circuit de Lorraine
1st Stage 4
 10th Ronde van Drenthe
2010
 2nd GP Miguel Induráin
 7th Overall Volta a Catalunya
 10th Paris–Bourges
2011
 1st Stage 2 Circuit Cycliste Sarthe
 6th Coppa Bernocchi
 10th Coppa Ugo Agostoni
 10th Vattenfall Cyclassics
2012
 1st  Madison, National Track Championships (with Raymond Kreder)
 1st Stage 2 Circuit de la Sarthe
 2nd Overall Tour Méditerranéen
1st Young rider classification
1st Stages 2 & 3
 4th Road race, National Road Championships
 5th Nokere Koerse
 8th Clásica de Almería
2013
 9th Overall Four Days of Dunkirk
1st Stage 4
2014
 4th La Drôme Classic
 6th Volta Limburg Classic
 10th Giro dell'Emilia
2016
 6th Nokere Koerse
2017
 3rd Overall Arctic Race of Norway
 5th Overall Tour de Wallonie
 9th Eschborn–Frankfurt – Rund um den Finanzplatz

Grand Tour general classification results timeline

References

External links

 
 
 
 Cycling Base: Michel Kreder
 Cycling Quotient: Michel Kreder

1987 births
Living people
Dutch male cyclists
Cyclists from The Hague
UCI Road World Championships cyclists for the Netherlands
20th-century Dutch people
21st-century Dutch people